Disney's The Three Musketeers can refer to:
 The Three Musketeers, a 1993 action film
 Mickey, Donald, Goofy: The Three Musketeers, a 2004 animated film